Shamsul Alam (1947 – 8 December 2022) was a veteran of Bangladesh Liberation war. For his bravery during Operation Kilo Flight the Government of Bangladesh awarded him the title of Bir Uttom. He was awarded the Independence Day Award in 2017.

Early life 
Alam was born in 1947 in Patilapara, Baufal Upazila, Patuakhali District.

Career 
Alam joined Pakistan Air Force and was stationed in Rawalpindi, West Pakistan (now Pakistan) in 1971. When the Bangladesh Liberation war started, he kept looking for opportunities to join it. He came to Dhaka to join the war. He was immediately detained in Dhaka.

In August–September 1971, the Pakistani government announced a general amnesty for the detainees. Alam was released in the first week of September. A few days later he fled from Dhaka to India and joined the war. At that time the process of formation of the air wing of the Mukti Bahini had just started in India. He was included in the wing. Their training started a few days later. After a few weeks of training in Dimapur, Nagaland, he mastered the art of throwing bombs, rockets, etc. at the right targets with the help of civilian aircraft. Shamsul Alam operated at the Eastern Refinery in Chittagong. From Kamalpur, India, he and Akram Ahmed set off for Chittagong on an Otter plane in Operation Kilo Flight. The aircraft had no modern directional equipment other than a fork-compass.

Alam and Akram Ahmed flew along the coastline of Chittagong and reached the oil refineries of the Eastern Refinery in time. The scheduled time of the attack was midnight. The bombs were dropped one minute past midnight. The attack left oil depots around the Eastern Refinery on fire.

After the Independence of Bangladesh, he served in the Bangladesh Air Force. He established a number of institutions of the Air Force including Flying Training Academy.

Death 
Group Captain(Retd.) Shamsul Alam died on 8 December in a private medical.

References 

Mukti Bahini personnel
Bangladesh Air Force personnel
2022 deaths
1947 births
Recipients of the Bir Uttom